

99001–99100 

|-id=070
| 99070 Strittmatter ||  || Peter Strittmatter (born 1939) is an American astronomer, involved with the Large Binocular Telescope and Giant Magellan Telescope projects, as well as regent professor, chairman of astronomy and director of the Steward Observatory at the University of Arizona. || 
|}

99101–99200 

|-id=193
| 99193 Obsfabra ||  || The Fabra Observatory in Barcelona, Spain. It was inaugurated on 7 April 1904 and has been known for its work in astronomy, meteorology and seismology. || 
|}

99201–99300 

|-
| 99201 Sattler ||  || Birgit I. Sattler (born 1969), Austrian limnologist, zoologist, and Antarctic explorer at the department of limnology and zoology at the University of Innsbruck. The two Antarctica expeditions she was a member of were sponsored by the National Science Foundation and the Planetary Studies Foundation, respectively. The name was suggested by H. Windolf. || 
|-id=262
| 99262 Bleustein ||  || Marcel Bleustein-Blanchet (1906–1996) was a French publicist and founder of the Foundation of the Vocation in 1960. The discoverer of this minor planet, Jean-Claude Merlin, was a laureate of this foundation. || 
|}

99301–99400 

|-bgcolor=#f2f2f2
| colspan=4 align=center | 
|}

99401–99500 

|-bgcolor=#f2f2f2
| colspan=4 align=center | 
|}

99501–99600 

|-id=503
| 99503 Leewonchul ||  || Won Chul Lee (David W. Lee; 1896–1963), Korean astronomer, the first Korean to earn a Ph.D. degree, and the first director of the National Observatory in Seoul || 
|-id=581
| 99581 Egal ||  || Auriane Egal (born 1991 ) is a postdoctoral associate at Western University in London, Canada. Her research focuses on the observation, modeling and prediction of meteor showers. || 
|}

99601–99700 

|-bgcolor=#f2f2f2
| colspan=4 align=center | 
|}

99701–99800 

|-bgcolor=#f2f2f2
| colspan=4 align=center | 
|}

99801–99900 

|-id=824
| 99824 Polnareff ||  || Michel Polnareff (born 1944) is a French singer and a songwriter who has been very popular since his 1966 recording of the song "La poupée qui fait non" || 
|-id=861
| 99861 Tscharnuter ||  || Werner M. Tscharnuter (born 1945) is a German astrophysicist who has made major contributions to the fields of star formation, protoplanetary disks, stellar dynamics and Saturn's rings. He also has an interest in celestial mechanics, particularly with regard to the evolution of the Koronis family, to which this minor planet probably belongs. || 
|-id=862
| 99862 Kenlevin ||  || Ken Levin (born 1953) is an American physicist who works in the field of infrared optics and sensors for application in medicine, aerospace and astronomy. He is an avid amateur astronomer, operates two private observatories and is a discoverer of minor planets. || 
|-id=863
| 99863 Winnewisser ||  ||  (1936–2011) was a German astrophysicist who established the KOSMA sub-mm telescope on Gornergrat and set up successful partnerships between the University of Cologne – of which he was the chairman of the Physics Institute from 1979 to 2001 – and research institutes worldwide. He was a member of three IAU Commissions and was honored with many prizes. || 
|-id=891
| 99891 Donwells ||  || Don J. Wells (born 1965) is an American production manager of a Houston-area television station and a discoverer of minor planets (working from George Observatory and the Remote Astronomical Society Observatory of New Mexico). || 
|}

99901–100000 

|-id=905
| 99905 Jeffgrossman ||  || Jeffrey N. Grossman (born 1955), an American chemist and meteoriticist at the U.S. Geological Survey in Reston, Virginia, conducts research in meteoritics and geochemistry. He is best known for his work on the origin of chondrules and chondrites and for studies of metamorphic processes on minor planets in the early Solar System. || 
|-id=906
| 99906 Uofalberta ||  || The University of Alberta ("Uofalberta") was founded in 1908 in Edmonton and is one of the leading research institutions in Canada. The initials of its motto Quaecumque Vera ("Whatsoever things are true") appropriately appear in the provisional designation for this minor planet. || 
|-id=928
| 99928 Brainard ||  || Bradley J. Brainard (born 1955) , American surgeon at the Tucson Orthopedic Institute. He has also held a residency in orthopedic surgery at the University of Arizona School of Medicine and a fellowship in foot-and-ankle surgery at the University of Cincinnati. || 
|-id=941
| 99941 Lonniewege ||  || Lonnie Wege (born 1958) is a telescope sales manager and a Schmidt-Cassegrain telescope technology specialist. He is also an astronomy outreach volunteer with the Three Rivers Foundation, the Texas Astronomical Society and Celestron. || 
|-id=942
| 99942 Apophis ||  || Apep the Destroyer (or Apophis in Greek), is the Egyptian god of evil and destruction who dwelled in eternal darkness. As a result of its passage within 40,000 kilometers of the Earth on 13 April 2029, this minor planet will move from the Aten to the Apollo class. || 
|-id=949
| 99949 Miepgies || 1972 FD || Miep Gies (1909–2010), née Hermine Santrouschitz, was one of the Dutch citizens who hid Anne Frank and her family from the Nazis during World War II. She discovered and preserved the Diary of Anne Frank after her arrest and deportation. The name was suggested by Carl Egon Koppeschaar (see ). || 
|-id=950
| 99950 Euchenor ||  || Euchenor, hero from Corinth in Greek mythology, was killed in the Trojan War by Paris. || 
|-id=000
| 100000 Astronautica ||  || "Astronautica", on the occasion of the 50th anniversary of the Space Age (beginning with the launch of Sputnik 1 in 1957), and because space arbitrarily begins at an altitude of 100,000 meters above Earth's surface (Src) || 
|}

References 

099001-100000